Barnes Halt railway station served a location midway between Creeslough and Kilmacrenan in County Donegal, Ireland.

Barnes Halt was not a 'station' in the ordinary sense. It was simply a stopping point at the level crossing across the Kilmacrennan-Creeslough road, a few miles north of Termon. There was no station building or platforms, only the embankment on which the rail track ran, and the house occupied by the railway employee responsible for manning the level crossing gates. The station opened on 9 March 1903 when the Londonderry and Lough Swilly Railway opened their Letterkenny and Burtonport Extension Railway, from Letterkenny to Burtonport. It closed on 3 June 1940 when the LLSR closed the line from Tooban Junction to Burtonport in an effort to save money. In 1925 there four passengers were killed when, in a strong storm, some carriages of the train were blown off the Owencarrow viaduct.

Routes

References

Disused railway stations in County Donegal
Railway stations opened in 1928
Railway stations closed in 1940
1928 establishments in Ireland
1940 disestablishments in Ireland
Railway stations in the Republic of Ireland opened in the 20th century